In discrete mathematics, ideal lattices are a special class of lattices and a generalization of cyclic lattices.  Ideal lattices naturally occur in many parts of number theory, but also in other areas. In particular, they have a significant place in cryptography. Micciancio defined a generalization of cyclic lattices as ideal lattices. They can be used in cryptosystems to decrease by a square root the number of parameters necessary to describe a lattice, making them more efficient. Ideal lattices are a new concept, but similar lattice classes have been used for a long time. For example, cyclic lattices, a special case of ideal lattices, are used in NTRUEncrypt and NTRUSign.

Ideal lattices also form the basis for quantum computer attack resistant cryptography based on the Ring Learning with Errors. These cryptosystems are provably secure under the assumption that the shortest vector problem (SVP) is hard in these ideal lattices.

Introduction
In general terms, ideal lattices are lattices corresponding to ideals in rings  of the form  for some irreducible polynomial  of degree . The family of ideal lattices for the ring  under the embedding  is the set of all lattices , where  is an ideal in

Definition

Notation
Let  be a monic polynomial of degree , and consider the quotient ring .

Using the standard set of representatives , and identification of polynomials with vectors, the quotient ring  is isomorphic (as an additive group) to the integer lattice , and any ideal  defines a corresponding integer sublattice .

An ideal lattice is an integer lattice  such that  for some monic polynomial  of degree  and ideal .

Related properties
  should be irreducible.

Ding and Lindner gave evidence that distinguishing ideal lattices from general ones can be done in polynomial time and showed that in practice randomly chosen lattices are never ideal. They only considered the case where the lattice has full rank, i.e. the basis consists of  linear independent vectors. This is not a fundamental restriction because Lyubashevsky and Micciancio have shown that if a lattice is ideal with respect to an irreducible monic polynomial, then it has full rank, as given in the above lemma.

Algorithm: Identifying ideal lattices with full rank bases

Data: A full-rank basis  

 Transform  into HNF
 Calculate the product 
 if only the last column of P is non-zero then
 set  to equal this column
 else return false
 if  for  then
 use CRT to find  and 
 else return false
 if  then
 return true, 
 else return false

where the matrix M is

Using this algorithm, it can be seen that many lattices are not ideal lattices.

is ideal, but

Performing the algorithm on it and referring to the basis as B, matrix B is already in Hermite Normal Form so the first step is not needed.

and finally, the product  is

At this point the algorithm stops, because all but the last column of  have to be zero if  would span an ideal lattice.

Use in cryptography
Micciancio introduced the class of structured cyclic lattices, which correspond to ideals in polynomial rings  , and presented the first provably secure one-way function based on the worst-case hardness of the restriction of Poly(n)-SVP to cyclic lattices. (The problem γ-SVP consists in computing a non-zero vector of a given lattice, whose norm is no more than γ times larger than the norm of a shortest non-zero lattice vector.)  At the same time, thanks to its algebraic structure, this one-way function enjoys high efficiency comparable to the NTRU scheme  evaluation time and storage cost). Subsequently, Lyubashevsky and Micciancio and independently Peikert and Rosen showed how to modify Micciancio's function to construct an efficient and provably secure collision resistant hash function. For this, they introduced the more general class of ideal lattices, which correspond to ideals in polynomial rings . The collision resistance relies on the hardness of the restriction of Poly(n)-SVP to ideal lattices (called Poly(n)-Ideal-SVP). The average-case collision-finding problem is a natural computational problem called Ideal-SIS, which has been shown to be as hard as the worst-case instances of Ideal-SVP. Provably secure efficient signature schemes from ideal lattices have also been proposed, but constructing efficient provably secure public key encryption  from ideal lattices was an interesting open problem.

The fundamental idea of using LWE and Ring LWE for key exchange was proposed and filed at the University of Cincinnati in 2011 by Jintai Ding and provided a state of the art description of a quantum resistant key exchange using Ring LWE. The paper appeared in 2012 after a provisional patent application was filed in 2012. In 2014, Peikert presented a key transport scheme following the same basic idea of Ding's, where the new idea of sending additional signal for rounding in Ding's construction is also utilized. A digital signature using the same concepts was done several years earlier by Vadim Lyubashevsky in, "Lattice Signatures Without Trapdoors."   Together, the work of Peikert and Lyubashevsky provide a suite of Ring-LWE based quantum attack resistant algorithms with the same security reductions.

Efficient collision resistant hash functions
The main usefulness of the ideal lattices in cryptography stems from the fact that very efficient and practical collision resistant hash functions can be built based on the hardness of finding an approximate shortest vector in such lattices.
Independently constructed collision resistant hash functions by Peikert and Rosen, as well as Lyubashevsky and Micciancio, based on ideal lattices (a generalization of cyclic lattices), and provided a fast and practical implementation. These results paved the way for other efficient cryptographic constructions including identification schemes and signatures.

Lyubashevsky and Micciancio gave constructions of efficient collision resistant hash functions that can be proven secure based on worst case hardness of the shortest vector problem for ideal lattices. The ordered -tuple  determines the hash function. Since  is a constant,
hashing requires time . They proved that the hash function family is collision resistant  by showing that if there is a polynomial-time algorithm that succeeds with non-negligible probability in finding  such that
, for a randomly chosen hash function , then a certain
problem called the “shortest vector problem” is solvable in polynomial time for every ideal of the ring .

Based on the work of Lyubashevsky and Micciancio in 2006, Micciancio and Regev defined the following algorithm of hash functions based on ideal lattices:

probability) is as hard as solving various lattice problems (such as approximate SVP and SIVP) in the worst
case over ideal lattices, provided the vector f satisfies the following two properties:
 The polynomial  is irreducible over the integers, i.e., it does not factor into the product of integer polynomials of smaller degree.

The first property is satisfied by the vector  corresponding to circulant matrices,
because all the coordinates of [F∗u]v are bounded by 1, and hence . So,  is not a good choice to get collision resistant hash functions, but many other choices are possible. For example, some choices of f for which both properties are satisfied (and therefore, result in collision resistant hash functions with worst-case security guarantees) are
  where  is prime, and
  for  equal to a power of 2.

Digital signatures
Digital signatures schemes are among the most important cryptographic primitives. They can be obtained by using the one-way functions based on the worst-case hardness of lattice problems. However, they are impractical. A number of new digital signature schemes based on learning with errors, ring learning with errors and trapdoor lattices have been developed since the learning with errors problem was applied in a cryptographic context.

Their direct construction of digital signatures based on the complexity of approximating the shortest vector in ideal (e.g., cyclic) lattices.  The scheme of Lyubashevsky and Micciancio has worst-case security guarantees based on ideal lattices and it is the most asymptotically efficient construction known to date, yielding signature generation and verification algorithms that run in almost linear time.

One of the main open problems that was raised by their work  is constructing a one-time signature with similar efficiency, but based on a weaker hardness assumption.

Their construction is based on a standard transformation from one-time signatures (i.e. signatures that allow to securely sign a single message) to general signature schemes, together with a novel construction of a lattice based one-time signature whose security is ultimately based on the worst-case hardness of approximating the shortest vector in all lattices corresponding to ideals in the ring  for any irreducible polynomial .

Key-Generation Algorithm:
Input: , irreducible polynomial  of degree .
 For all positive , let the sets   and   be defined as:
 such that 
 such that 
 Choose uniformly random 
 Pick a uniformly random string 
 If  then
 Set 
 else
 Set  to the position of the first 1 in the string 
 end if
 Signing Key: . Verification Key: 

Signing Algorithm:

Input: Message  such that ; signing key 

Output: 

Verification Algorithm:

Input: Message ; signature ; verification key 

Output: “ACCEPT”, if  and 

“REJECT”, otherwise.

The SWIFFT hash function
The hash function is quite efficient and can be computed asymptotically in  time using the Fast Fourier Transform (FFT)  over the complex numbers. However, in practice, this carries a substantial overhead.
Multiplication by the invertible matrix   maps a uniformly chosen  to a uniformly chosen . Moreover,  if and only if .
Together, these two facts establish that finding collisions in SWIFFT is equivalent to finding collisions in the underlying ideal lattice function , and the claimed collision resistance property of SWIFFT is supported by the connection to worst case lattice problems on ideal lattices.

The algorithm of the SWIFFT hash function is:
 Input:  vectors .
 Output: the vector , where  is the component-wise vector product.

Learning with errors (LWE)

Ring-LWE
Learning with errors (LWE)  problem has been shown to be as hard as worst-case lattice problems and has served as the foundation for many cryptographic applications. However, these applications are inefficient because of an inherent quadratic overhead in the use of LWE. To get truly efficient LWE applications, Lyubashevsky, Peikert and Regev defined an appropriate version of the LWE problem in a wide class of rings and proved its hardness under worst-case assumptions on ideal lattices in these rings. They called their LWE version ring-LWE.

Let , where the security parameter  is a power of 2, making  irreducible over the rationals. (This particular  comes from the family of cyclotomic polynomials, which play a special role in this work).

Let  be the ring of integer polynomials modulo .

In the above-described ring, the R-LWE problem may be described as follows.
Let  be a uniformly random ring element, which is kept secret. Analogously to standard LWE, the goal of the attacker is to distinguish arbitrarily many (independent) ‘random noisy ring equations’ from truly uniform ones.

This result follows the general outline of Regev's iterative quantum reduction for general lattices, but ideal lattices introduce several new technical roadblocks in both the ‘algebraic’ and ‘geometric’ components of the reduction. They  used  algebraic number theory, in particular, the canonical embedding of a number field and the Chinese Remainder Theorem to overcome these obstacles. They got the following theorem:

Theorem Let  be an arbitrary number field of degree . Let  be arbitrary, and let the (rational) integer modulus  be such that . There is a probabilistic polynomial-time quantum reduction from - to - , where .

In 2013, Guneysu, Lyubashevsky, and Poppleman proposed a digital signature scheme based on the Ring Learning with Errors problem. In 2014, Peikert presented a Ring Learning with Errors Key Exchange (RLWE-KEX) in his paper, "Lattice Cryptography for the Internet." This was further developed by the work of Singh.

Ideal-LWE
Stehle, Steinfeld, Tanaka and Xagawa defined a structured variant of LWE problem (Ideal-LWE) to describe an efficient public key encryption scheme based on the worst case hardness of the approximate SVP in ideal lattices. This is the first CPA-secure public key encryption scheme whose security relies on the hardness of the worst-case instances of -Ideal-SVP against subexponential quantum attacks. It achieves asymptotically optimal efficiency: the public/private key length is   bits and the amortized encryption/decryption cost is  bit operations per message bit (encrypting   bits at once, at a  cost). The security assumption here is that -Ideal-SVP cannot be solved by any subexponential time quantum algorithm. It is noteworthy that this is stronger than standard public key cryptography security assumptions. On the other hand, contrary to the most of public key cryptography, lattice-based cryptography  allows security against subexponential quantum attacks.

Most of the cryptosystems based on general lattices rely on the average-case hardness of the Learning with errors (LWE).  Their scheme is based on a structured variant of LWE, that they call Ideal-LWE. They needed to  introduce some techniques to circumvent two main difficulties that arise from the restriction to ideal lattices. Firstly, the previous cryptosystems based on unstructured lattices all make use of Regev's worst-case to average-case classical reduction from Bounded Distance Decoding problem (BDD) to LWE (this is the classical step in the quantum reduction from SVP to LWE). This reduction exploits the unstructured-ness of the considered lattices, and does not seem to carry over to the structured lattices involved in Ideal-LWE. In particular, the probabilistic independence of the rows of the LWE matrices allows to consider a single row. Secondly, the other ingredient used in previous cryptosystems, namely Regev's reduction from the computational variant of LWE to its decisional variant, also seems to fail for Ideal-LWE: it relies on the probabilistic independence of the columns of the LWE matrices.

To overcome these difficulties, they avoided the classical step of the reduction. Instead, they used the quantum step to construct a new quantum average-case reduction from SIS (average-case collision-finding problem) to LWE. It also works from Ideal-SIS to Ideal-LWE. Combined with the reduction from worst-case Ideal-SVP to average-case Ideal-SIS, they obtained the a quantum reduction from Ideal-SVP to Ideal-LWE. This shows the hardness of the computational variant of Ideal-LWE. Because they did not obtain the hardness of the decisional variant, they used a generic hardcore function to derive pseudorandom bits for encryption. This is why they needed to assume the exponential hardness of SVP.

Fully homomorphic encryption
A fully homomorphic encryption (FHE) scheme is one which allows for computation over encrypted data, without first needing to decrypt. The problem of constructing a fully homomorphic encryption scheme  was first put forward by Rivest, Adleman and Dertouzos in 1978,  shortly after the invention of RSA by Rivest, Adleman and Shamir.

An encryption scheme  is homomorphic for circuits in  if, for any circuit ,

it holds that .

 is fully homomorphic if it is homomorphic for all circuits of size  where  is the scheme's security parameter.

In 2009, Gentry proposed the first solution to the problem of constructing a fully homomorphic encryption scheme. His scheme was based on ideal lattices.

See also
Lattice-based cryptography
Homomorphic encryption
Ring learning with errors key exchange
Post-quantum cryptography
Short integer solution problem

References

Number theory
Lattice-based cryptography
Post-quantum cryptography